Nossoncourt is a commune in the Vosges department in Grand Est in northeastern France.

History
Nossoncourt was a lordship and the local capital or a territory which also included the modern communes of Anglemont, Bazien, Sainte-Barbe, Ménil-sur-Belvitte, Ménarmont et Xaffévillers.

According to a title document dated 1345 it was one of the earliest fiefs belonging to the Bishopric of Metz.

The Thirty Years War brought destruction to many villages in the contested territories between France and The Empire.   Nossoncourt was destroyed by a Swedish army in 1635, the Swedes being at that point allies of the French and enemies of the Dukes of Lorraine.

During the twentieth century wars the village was again the scene of violent fighting notably in 1914 and in the Autumn/Fall of 1944.

See also
Communes of the Vosges department

References

Communes of Vosges (department)